This article catalogs the songwriting, musician, and production credits for Steve Lacy-Moya, better known as Steve Lacy. Lacy began his career as a guitarist and producer for the Los Angeles-based R&B/soul band, the Internet, and as a solo artist in the mid-to-late 2010s. His debut project, a song series titled Steve Lacy's Demo, was released in February 2017 and his debut album, Apollo XXI, was released in May 2019.

Albums

Studio albums

Compilation albums
The Lo-Fis (2020)

Extended plays 
Steve Lacy's Demo (2017)

With the Internet 

Ego Death (2015)
Hive Mind (2018)

Singles

As lead artist

As featured artist

Other charted songs

Guest appearances

Writing discography 

Notes
"Verbs" features background vocals by Steve Lacy.
"If Tomorrow's Not Here" features additional vocals by Steve Lacy.
"Moron" was cut from Steve Lacy's Demo but was later self-released for free on April 1, 2017.
"PRIDE." features background vocals from Anna Wise, Steve Lacy, and additional vocals from Bēkon. Bēkon is listed as additional producer.
"Sticky" and "Closer (Ode 2 U)", from Crush, feature background vocals from Steve Lacy.
"Come Together" feature lead and background vocals from Syd and Steve Lacy, as well as background vocals from Nick Green and Durand Bernarr.
 "Roll (Burbank Funk)" and "La Di Da" feature lead and background vocals from Syd and Steve Lacy, as well as background vocals from Nick Green.
"Mood", "Next Time"/"Humble Pie", "Look What U Started", and "Wanna Be" feature background vocals from Steve Lacy.
"Beat Goes On" features lead and background vocals from Steve Lacy and Matt Martians, as well as background vocals from Marcus Lee.

Production discography 

Notes
 "Verbs" features background vocals by Steve Lacy.
 "If Tomorrow's Not Here" features additional vocals by Steve Lacy.
 "Foldin Clothes" feature talk-box by Irvin Washington, background vocals by Steve Lacy, and additional background vocals by T.S. Desandies and Brittany Carter.
"Worries" features background vocals by Steve Lacy.
"Treading Water" was cut from Syd's debut album Fin and contains the same instrumental as Twenty88's "Selfish" from their 2016 self-titled debut. It was self-released for free on March 27, 2017.
"Moron" was cut from Steve Lacy's Demo but was later self-released for free on April 1, 2017.
"PRIDE." features background vocals from Anna Wise, Steve Lacy, and additional vocals from Bēkon. Bēkon is listed as additional producer.
"Sticky" and "Closer (Ode 2 U)", from Crush, feature background vocals from Steve Lacy.
"Come Together" feature lead and background vocals from Syd and Steve Lacy, as well as background vocals from Nick Green and Durand Bernarr.
 "Roll (Burbank Funk)" and "La Di Da" feature lead and background vocals from Syd and Steve Lacy, as well as background vocals from Nick Green.
"Come Over" features lead and background vocals from Syd and Steve Lacy.
"Mood", "Next Time"/"Humble Pie", "Look What U Started", and "Wanna Be" feature background vocals from Steve Lacy.
"Beat Goes On" features lead and background vocals from Steve Lacy and Matt Martians, as well as background vocals from Marcus Lee.

Music videos

Notes

References 

Rhythm and blues discographies
Soul music discographies
Pop music discographies
Rock music discographies
Hip hop discographies
Jazz discographies
Production discographies
Discographies of American artists